Ōpunake is a small town on the southwest coast of Taranaki in New Zealand's North Island. It is located 45 kilometres southwest of New Plymouth. Rahotu is 16 km to the northwest. Manaia is 29 km to the southeast. State Highway 45 passes through the town. The town has a population of

History and culture

Pre-European history

In 1833 local chief Wiremu Kīngi Moki Te Matakātea held off a war party from Waikato for several weeks with a single musket, and eventually triumphed. The site of Te Namu Pā is along the coast, just north of the town.

European settlement

The town was first settled by Europeans in the 1860s, when British army soldiers landed at Ōpunake in April 1865 in the Second Taranaki War. By May, soldiers had constructed the Ōpunake Redoubt, where 350 soldiers were stationed. In May 1867, the redoubt was gifted to Wiremu Kīngi Moki Te Matakātea's people, and the area became a location for flax mills, outside European influence. British soldiers re-established a presence at the redoubt in 1875, and the area became a rallying point for soldiers during the invasion of Parihaka. By circa 1887, the redoubt was abandoned. Ōpunake was intended to be a major port but, other than a jetty constructed in 1891, little else was completed.

Marae

Ōpunake has two marae. Ōeo Marae and Tipua Horonuku and Tipua Hororangi meeting houses are affiliated with the Ngāruahine hapū of Ngāti Tamaahuroa me Tītahi. Ōrimupiko Marae and Ōhinetuhirau meeting house are a meeting place for the Taranaki hapū of Ngāti Haumia, Ngāti Tamarongo and Ngāti Kahumate.

In October 2020, the Government committed $153,419 from the Provincial Growth Fund to seal the driveway of the marae and paint the outside of all buildings, creating 12 jobs.

Pa 
Ōpunake is home to two pā. Te Namu Pā in the North West along the Otahi Stream and Te Namu road. As well as another pā in the South East which can be found along Park Pl near the Constabulary Cemetery by the lake. The condition of these pā vary, Te Namu Pā is mostly held up, the village and trenches no longer exist. However little remains of the pā in the South East.

History of Te Namu Pā 
Wiremu Kīngi Moki Te Matakātea led 120 men in a battle at Te Namu Pā against a Waikato contingent numbering approximately 800. The Waikato raid was unsuccessful and eventually retreated; those who were left behind were cremated in front of the pā. Wiremu Kīngi Moki Te Matakātea and his men won the battle partly because of the Geography and because of the singular musket that they had. The only entrance to the pā was accessible by following the Otahi stream around the back of it along a narrow walkway. The pā was attacked 5 times by Waikato forces with no success. Te Namu Pā is also rumoured to be named 'Kaiaia'.

The village that was made at Te Namu Pā in 1833 was destroyed by an landing party from HMS Alligator of 1834. The site is now considered a Urupa (Burial ground)."Greg O'Brien, poet, painter, editor and journalist, remembers Te Namu's association with Parihaka. He wrote: "my mother recalls an elderly aunt's recollection of the Parihaka siege—her description of a line of women singing, surrounding the settlement as the troops approached.) What escapes us, the land, kumara-pitted, remembers—adze heads recovered from among boulders, the faded shadows that were trenches around Te Namu pa. The site of the first fighting between British infantry—the 50th Regiment, ‘the Dirty Half Hundred’— and Maori.""

Demographics

Opunake had a population of 1,401 at the 2018 New Zealand census, an increase of 66 people (4.9%) since the 2013 census, and an increase of 36 people (2.6%) since the 2006 census. There were 570 households, comprising 681 males and 720 females, giving a sex ratio of 0.95 males per female. The median age was 44.2 years (compared with 37.4 years nationally), with 282 people (20.1%) aged under 15 years, 216 (15.4%) aged 15 to 29, 597 (42.6%) aged 30 to 64, and 303 (21.6%) aged 65 or older.

Ethnicities were 76.0% European/Pākehā, 37.7% Māori, 2.4% Pacific peoples, 3.4% Asian, and 1.9% other ethnicities. People may identify with more than one ethnicity.

The percentage of people born overseas was 11.6, compared with 27.1% nationally.

Although some people chose not to answer the census's question about religious affiliation, 50.1% had no religion, 36.4% were Christian, 3.4% had Māori religious beliefs, 0.6% were Hindu, 0.2% were Buddhist and 1.3% had other religions.

Of those at least 15 years old, 120 (10.7%) people had a bachelor's or higher degree, and 351 (31.4%) people had no formal qualifications. The median income was $23,000, compared with $31,800 nationally. 114 people (10.2%) earned over $70,000 compared to 17.2% nationally. The employment status of those at least 15 was that 417 (37.3%) people were employed full-time, 189 (16.9%) were part-time, and 54 (4.8%) were unemployed.

Features

Ōpunake is the centre for the local dairy industry, and is also a popular tourist spot. The beach is composed of volcanic blacksand and there are large rock pools to be found on the north-west end of the beach at low tide.

The Ōpunake and surrounding community has a South Taranaki District Council LibraryPlus, which provides full library and Council related services.

The Ōpunake murals, located on the main road in the town, reflect the town's farming history, Māori culture and modern history.

Education

Opunake High School is a coeducational secondary (years 9-13) school with a roll of  students as of  The school celebrated its 75th jubilee in 2000.

St Joseph's is a state integrated Catholic school. Te Kura Kaupapa Maori o Tamarongo is a Kura Kaupapa Māori school which teaches in the Māori language.

Notable people 

 Jim Bolger (born 1935), former New Zealand Prime Minister 
 Carl Hayman (born 1979),  rugby union footballer who played prop 
 Graham Mourie (born 1952), All Black captain
 Samuel Russell Feaver (1878-1946), farmer, pharmacist, veterinary surgeon, photographer
 Peter Snell (1938–2019), middle distance runner, a sculpture was unveiled on Saturday 19 May 2007
 Jacquie Sturm (1927 – 30 December 2009) poet, short story writer and librarian

See also 
 Opunake Beach

Notes

External links
 Opunake Website
 Opunake High School website
 Opunake School website
 St Joseph's School website

South Taranaki District
Populated places in Taranaki
Black sand beaches